Katsura or Katsuura may refer to:

Architecture
The Katsura imperial villa, one of Japan's most important architectural treasures, and a World Heritage Site

Botany
Katsura, the common name for Cercidiphyllum, a genus of two species of trees native to eastern Asia

Geography
Katsuura, Chiba, city located in Chiba Prefecture, Japan
Katsura, Tokushima, a town in Tokushima Prefecture, Japan
Katsura, Ibaraki, a former village in Ibaraki Prefecture, Japan
Katsura River, a Japanese river
Katsura, Kyoto, a suburb of Kyoto City in Kyoto Prefecture, Japan

People

Marquess Katsura Taro (1848–1913), Japanese Prime Minister 1901–1906, 1908–1911, 1912–1913
, Japanese singer
, a former name of Kido Takayoshi during the late Tokugawa period.
, Japanese manga artist
, Japanese carom billiards player
, a Japanese manga artist 
, Japanese rakugoka
, cousin of Emperor Akihito
, Japanese TV presenter
, Japanese rakugo performer
, Canadian traditional Japanese rakugo comic storyteller
, Japanese rakugo comedian 
, Japanese biathlete

Fictional characters

Hinagiku Katsura from the Hayate the Combat Butler anime and manga
Kotaro Katsura from the Gintama anime and manga
Mafune Katsura in the film Terror of Mechagodzilla
Kotonoha Katsura from the visual novel School Days
Katsura Tenjoin from YAT Anshin! Uchū Ryokō

Other
Katsura-no-miya, a branch of the Japanese Imperial Family

Japanese-language surnames
Japanese feminine given names